Tang-e Palangi may refer to:
 Tang-e Palangi, Bagh-e Malek
 Tang-e Palangi, Izeh